The 2018 Rio Open was a professional men's tennis tournament played on outdoor clay courts. It was the 5th edition of the tournament, and part of the ATP World Tour 500 series of the 2018 ATP World Tour. It took place in Rio de Janeiro, Brazil between February 19–25, 2018.

Points and prize money

Point distribution

Prize money 

1 Qualifiers prize money is also the Round of 32 prize money
* per team

Singles main-draw entrants

Seeds 

 1 Rankings as of February 12, 2018.

Other entrants 
The following players received wildcards into the singles main draw:
  Thomaz Bellucci
  Thiago Monteiro
  Casper Ruud

The following players received entry using a protected ranking:
  Pablo Andújar
  Andreas Haider-Maurer

The following players received entry from the qualifying draw:
  Carlos Berlocq
  Roberto Carballés Baena
  Marco Cecchinato 
  Corentin Moutet

The following player received entry as a lucky loser:
  Gastão Elias

Withdrawals 
Before the tournament
  Alexandr Dolgopolov → replaced by  Tennys Sandgren
  Kyle Edmund → replaced by  Pablo Andújar
  Paolo Lorenzi → replaced by  Gerald Melzer
  Corentin Moutet → replaced by  Gastão Elias
  Cedrik-Marcel Stebe → replaced by  Nicolás Kicker

Retirements 
  Pablo Andújar
  Roberto Carballés Baena
  Casper Ruud
  Jiří Veselý

Doubles main-draw entrants

Seeds 

 1 Rankings as of February 12, 2018.

Other entrants 
The following pairs received wildcards into the doubles main draw:
  Thomaz Bellucci /  André Sá 
  Fabiano de Paula /  Thiago Monteiro

The following pair received entry from the qualifying draw:
  Nicolás Jarry /  Jiří Veselý

The following pair received entry as lucky losers:
  David Marrero /  Fernando Verdasco

Withdrawals 
Before the tournament
  Pablo Carreño Busta

Champions

Singles 

  Diego Schwartzman def.  Fernando Verdasco, 6–2, 6–3

Doubles 

  David Marrero /  Fernando Verdasco def.  Nikola Mektić /  Alexander Peya, 5–7, 7–5, [10–8]

References

External links 
 Official website

2018
Rio Open
Rio Open
February 2018 sports events in South America